Magaly Solier Romero (born 11 June 1986) is a Peruvian actress and singer.

Magaly Solier Romero was born on 11 June 1986 in to a Quechua family, the province of Huanta, in the region of Ayacucho in Peru. She speaks the indigenous language of Quechua, as well as Spanish. Solier has publicly spoken about the importance of supporting indigenous language, traditions, and culture.

In 2003, she won the Festival de la Canción Ayacuchana with her singing. A year later, she made her debut as an actress in the film Madeinusa.

In June 2017, Solier was declared an Artist of Peace by UNESCO in Paris, France.

Personal life
On 9 June 2012, Solier married cyclist Erick Plinio Mendoza Gómez in an intimate ceremony in Huamanga, Ayacucho.  They became parents on 9 February 2013, when she gave birth to a son. In 2015, she announced her second pregnancy.

Filmography

Discography
Solier has performed several concerts in indigenous languages, including Quechua, Aymara, Ashaninka, and Muchik.
Warmi (2009), the term "warmi", means "woman" in Quechua.
Cocoa Quintucha (2015)

References

External links

(Spanish) Página Web Oficial

1986 births
Living people
People from Huanta Province
Peruvian people of Quechua descent
Peruvian film actresses
Peruvian composers
21st-century Peruvian women singers
21st-century Peruvian singers
Indigenous actors of the Americas
Quechua-language singers